Rushcreek Township is one of the seventeen townships of Logan County, Ohio, United States. As of the 2010 census, the population was 2,221.

Geography
Located in the northeastern part of the county, it borders the following townships:
Taylor Creek Township, Hardin County - north
Bokes Creek Township - east
Perry Township - southeast
Jefferson Township - south
Lake Township - southwest
McArthur Township - west
Richland Township - northwest

The village of Rushsylvania is located in central Rushcreek Township.

Name and history
Rushcreek Township was organized in 1827. It is the only Rushcreek Township statewide, although there are Rush Townships in Champaign, Scioto, and Tuscarawas counties, and a Rush Creek Township in Fairfield County.

Government
The township is governed by a three-member board of trustees, who are elected in November of odd-numbered years to a four-year term beginning on the following January 1. Two are elected in the year after the presidential election and one is elected in the year before it. There is also an elected township fiscal officer, who serves a four-year term beginning on April 1 of the year after the election, which is held in November of the year before the presidential election. Vacancies in the fiscal officership or on the board of trustees are filled by the remaining trustees.

In the elections of November 2007, Rick Kennedy defeated Michael Stolly in the election for the position of township trustee, while J. Andrew Johnson was elected without opposition to the position of township fiscal officer.

Transportation
U.S. Route 68 is the most important highway in Rushcreek Township.  Other significant highways include State Routes 47, 273, and 274.

References

External links
County website
County and township map of Ohio
Detailed Logan County map

Townships in Logan County, Ohio
Townships in Ohio
1827 establishments in Ohio
Populated places established in 1827